Diego Ángel Capel Trinidad (born 16 February 1988) is a Spanish professional footballer who plays as a left winger.

He made his senior debut with Sevilla at 16, going on to appear in 173 competitive matches for the club over seven La Liga seasons (12 goals) and win four major trophies, including two UEFA Cups. In 2011, he signed for Sporting CP, totalling 142 games and winning the 2014–15 Taça de Portugal; subsequently, he had a nomadic career.

Capel earned 60 caps for Spain across all youth categories, representing the under-21s in two European Championships. He made his full debut in 2008.

Club career

Sevilla
Groomed in Sevilla FC's youth system (after a brief spell at FC Barcelona), Capel was born in Albox, Province of Almería, and he made his first professional appearance aged only 16, playing three minutes in a 2–1 home win against Atlético Madrid on 24 October 2004. In the following seasons he would alternate between the A and B teams, playing four further games in 2005–06 with the main squad; on 1 December 2005 he appeared 18 minutes in the Andalusians' 3–1 victory over Vitória de Guimarães also at the Ramón Sánchez Pizjuán Stadium, in an eventual victorious campaign in the UEFA Cup.

Capel became first-choice in the 2007–08 season due to the death of another left-footed winger, Antonio Puerta, in late August. He scored his first goal in La Liga on 9 February 2008, in a 1–1 home draw with Barcelona. The previous month, he had netted in a Copa del Rey tie against the same opponent (also 1–1 and in Seville).

In June 2008, Premier League's Tottenham Hotspur were linked with a £12.5 million bid for Capel. He admitted he would consider leaving Sevilla to "grow as a footballer", if the clubs could agree on a signing fee, but nothing came of it. Also at the end of the league campaign, Barcelona-based daily Sport further speculated that Real Madrid were considering Capel as a potential replacement for the recently departed Robinho, but no move ever materialised.

In the 2009–10 campaign, Capel lost his position to Argentine Diego Perotti, but still managed to feature in 29 matches – one goal in a 5–1 win at Racing de Santander– as Sevilla edged RCD Mallorca for the fourth position, with the subsequent qualification to the UEFA Champions League. Additionally, on 19 May 2010, he opened the score at the Camp Nou in a 2–0 defeat of Atlético in the final of the domestic cup.

Capel appeared again regularly in 2010–11, playing 27 league games and starting in 17 as the team finished in fifth position.

Sporting CP
On 18 July 2011, Capel's uncle Carioca acknowledged negotiations between Sevilla and Sporting CP for the transfer of the player for €6 million and a five-year contract, although the fee agreed was eventually €3.5 million with a €30 million buyout clause. He made his debut for his new club on the 30th, playing the second half of a 0–3 friendly home loss to Valencia CF.

Capel scored his first goal for Sporting on 2 October 2011, in a 1–0 Primeira Liga away win over Vitória de Guimarães. On the 24th, in the same competition, he netted twice in a 6–1 home rout of Gil Vicente F.C. in what was the Lions ninth straight official win.

On 19 April 2012, Capel scored his seventh competitive goal of the season, helping the hosts come from behind to win 2–1 against Athletic Bilbao in the Europa League semi-finals first leg. He was part of the squad that won the Taça de Portugal in 2015, but his input consisted of the 5–0 victory at S.C. Espinho in the fourth round.

Genoa and Anderlecht
On 18 August 2015, as his minutes at Sporting were dwindling dramatically, Capel signed for Genoa C.F.C. in Italy for a reported fee of €1.3 million, as the former retained 50% of his rights regarding any future transfer fee the latter received. The following 4 August 2016 he switched countries again, signing a two-year deal with the option for a third at R.S.C. Anderlecht in the Belgian First Division A; in the winter transfer window the former were looking to transfer him, and he was eventually released in August 2017 having made 25 competitive appearances and scored two goals.

In March 2018, Capel turned down an approach from EFL League Two club Notts County.

Later career
On 4 August 2018, after more than a year without a club, the 30-year-old Capel moved to Segunda División side Extremadura UD on a two-year contract. He was joined there by his former Sevilla teammate José Antonio Reyes, who died in a car crash in June 2019; the following month, he left the team from Almendralejo having played just 382 minutes.

Capel moved abroad again in January 2020, to Birkirkara F.C. of the Maltese Premier League. He signed until the end of the season with the option of one more, but left in March as the COVID-19 pandemic erupted.

In February 2022, after nearly two years of inactivity, the 34-year-old Capel joined Super League Greece 2 club Irodotos FC.

International career
After having helped Spain win the 2006 UEFA European Under-19 Championship, Capel played in the 2007 FIFA World Cup with the under-20 team, scoring in injury time in the first game against Uruguay for the final 2–2. He helped the country progress to the quarter-finals where they were knocked out by the Czech Republic, and subsequently moved to the under-21s.

Capel made his debut for the senior side on 20 August 2008, playing the second half of a friendly with Denmark and setting up two goals in the 3–0 away win.

Career statistics
Club

Honours
ClubSevillaCopa del Rey: 2009–10
Supercopa de España: 2007; Runner-up 2010
UEFA Cup: 2005–06, 2006–07
UEFA Super Cup runner-up: 2007Sporting CPTaça de Portugal: 2014–15; Runner-up 2011–12AnderlechtBelgian First Division A: 2016–17

InternationalSpain U21UEFA European Under-21 Championship: 2011Spain U19'
UEFA European Under-19 Championship: 2006

Individual
SJPF Player of the Month: October 2011

References

External links

1988 births
Living people
Sportspeople from the Province of Almería
Spanish footballers
Footballers from Andalusia
Association football wingers
La Liga players
Segunda División players
Segunda División B players
Sevilla Atlético players
Sevilla FC players
Extremadura UD footballers
Primeira Liga players
Sporting CP footballers
Serie A players
Genoa C.F.C. players
Belgian Pro League players
R.S.C. Anderlecht players
Maltese Premier League players
Birkirkara F.C. players
Super League Greece 2 players
UEFA Cup winning players
Spain youth international footballers
Spain under-21 international footballers
Spain under-23 international footballers
Spain international footballers
Spanish expatriate footballers
Expatriate footballers in Portugal
Expatriate footballers in Italy
Expatriate footballers in Belgium
Expatriate footballers in Malta
Expatriate footballers in Greece
Spanish expatriate sportspeople in Portugal
Spanish expatriate sportspeople in Italy
Spanish expatriate sportspeople in Belgium
Spanish expatriate sportspeople in Malta
Spanish expatriate sportspeople in Greece